Calceolaria, also called lady's purse, slipper flower and pocketbook flower, or slipperwort, is a genus of plants in the family Calceolariaceae, sometimes classified in Scrophulariaceae by some authors. This genus consists of about 388 species of shrubs, lianas and herbs, and the geographical range extends from Patagonia to central Mexico, with its distribution centre in Andean region. Calceolaria species have usually yellow or orange flowers, which can have red or purple spots. The Calceolaria Herbeohybrida group, also called C. herbeohybrida Voss, is a group of ornamental hybrids known only in cultivation, called florists' slipperwort.

Species
Calceolaria contains the following species:

Calceolaria aconcaguina Phil.
Calceolaria adenanthera Molau
Calceolaria adenocalyx Molau
Calceolaria aiseniana Ehrh.
Calceolaria ajugoides Kraenzl.
Calceolaria alata (Pennell) Pennell
Calceolaria alba Ruiz & Pav.
Calceolaria albotomentosa Pennell
Calceolaria amoena Molau
Calceolaria andina Benth.
Calceolaria angustiflora Ruiz & Pav.
Calceolaria angustifolia (Lindl.) Sweet
Calceolaria anisanthera Pennell
Calceolaria annua Edwin
Calceolaria aperta Edwin
Calceolaria aquatica A.Braun & C.D.Bouché
Calceolaria arachnoidea Graham
Calceolaria arbuscula Molau
Calceolaria argentea Kunth
Calceolaria ascendens Lindl.
Calceolaria asperula Phil.
Calceolaria atahualpae Kraenzl.
Calceolaria auriculata Phil.
Calceolaria australis (Molau) Molau
Calceolaria ballotifolia Kraenzl.
Calceolaria barbata Molau
Calceolaria bartsiifolia Wedd.
Calceolaria belophora Pennell
Calceolaria bentae Molau
Calceolaria bicolor Ruiz & Pav.
Calceolaria bicrenata Ruiz & Pav.
Calceolaria biflora Lam.
Calceolaria bogotensis (Pennell) Pennell
Calceolaria boliviana (Britton ex Rusby) Pennell
Calceolaria borsinii Rossow
Calceolaria brachiata Kraenzl.
Calceolaria brunellifolia Phil.
Calceolaria buchtieniana Kraenzl.
Calceolaria bullata Molau
Calceolaria caespitosa Molau
Calceolaria cajabambae Kraenzl.
Calceolaria calycina Benth.
Calceolaria campanae Phil.
Calceolaria cana Cav.
Calceolaria cataractarum Molau
Calceolaria cavanillesii Phil.
Calceolaria chaetostemon Pennell
Calceolaria chelidonioides Kunth
Calceolaria chrysosphaera Pennell
Calceolaria collina Phil.
Calceolaria colombiana Pennell
Calceolaria colquepatana Pennell
Calceolaria commutata Molau
Calceolaria comosa Pennell
Calceolaria concava Molau
Calceolaria connatifolia Pennell
Calceolaria conocarpa Pennell
Calceolaria cordifolia Molau
Calceolaria cordiformis Edwin ex Moldau
Calceolaria corymbosa Ruiz & Pav.
Calceolaria crassa Molau
Calceolaria crenata Lam.
Calceolaria crenatiflora Cav.
Calceolaria cumbemayensis Molau
Calceolaria cuneiformis Ruiz & Pav.
Calceolaria cypripediiflora Kraenzl.
Calceolaria deflexa Ruiz & Pav.
Calceolaria densiflora Molau
Calceolaria densifolia Phil.
Calceolaria dentata Ruiz & Pav.
Calceolaria dentifolia Edwin
Calceolaria dichotoma Lam.
Calceolaria dilatata Benth.
Calceolaria discotheca Molau
Calceolaria divaricata Kunth
Calceolaria elatior Griseb.
Calceolaria engleriana Kraenzl.
Calceolaria ericoides Juss. ex Vahl
Calceolaria extensa Benth.
Calceolaria ferruginea Cav.
Calceolaria filicaulis Clos
Calceolaria flavovirens C.Ehrh.
Calceolaria flexuosa Ruiz & Pav.
Calceolaria flosparva Edwin
Calceolaria fothergillii Aiton
Calceolaria frondosa Molau
Calceolaria fulva Witasek
Calceolaria fusca Pennell
Calceolaria gaultherioides Molau
Calceolaria georgiana Phil.
Calceolaria germainii Witasek
Calceolaria glacialis Wedd.
Calceolaria glandulosa Poepp. ex Benth.
Calceolaria glauca Ruiz & Pav.
Calceolaria gossypina Benth.
Calceolaria grandiflora Pennell
Calceolaria harlingii Molau
Calceolaria helianthemoides Kunth
Calceolaria heterophylla Ruiz & Pav.
Calceolaria hirsuta Molau
Calceolaria hirtiflora Pennell
Calceolaria hispida Benth.
Calceolaria hypericina Poepp. ex Benth.
Calceolaria hypoleuca Meyen
Calceolaria hyssopifolia Kunth
Calceolaria inamoena Kraenzl.
Calceolaria inaudita Kraenzl.
Calceolaria incachacensis Kraenzl.
Calceolaria incarum Kraenzl.
Calceolaria inflexa Ruiz & Pav.
Calceolaria integrifolia L.
Calceolaria involuta Ruiz & Pav.
Calceolaria irazuensis Donn.Sm.
Calceolaria jujuyensis Botta
Calceolaria juncalensis Kraenzl.
Calceolaria kraenzliniae Kraenzl.
Calceolaria laevis Molau
Calceolaria lagunae-blancae Kraenzl.
Calceolaria lamiifolia Kunth
Calceolaria lanata Kunth
Calceolaria lanigera Phil.
Calceolaria lasiocalyx Pennell
Calceolaria latifolia Benth.
Calceolaria lavandulifolia Kunth
Calceolaria lehmanniana Kraenzl.
Calceolaria lepida Phil.
Calceolaria lepidota Kraenzl.
Calceolaria leptantha Pennell
Calceolaria leucanthera Pennell
Calceolaria linearis Ruiz & Pav.
Calceolaria llamaensis (Edwin) Molau
Calceolaria lobata Cav.
Calceolaria lojensis Pennell
Calceolaria ludens Kraenzl.
Calceolaria luteocalyx Edwin
Calceolaria maculata Edwin
Calceolaria mandoniana Kraenzl.
Calceolaria martinezii Kraenzl.
Calceolaria melissifolia Benth.
Calceolaria mexicana Benth.
Calceolaria meyeniana Phil.
Calceolaria micans Molau
Calceolaria microbefaria Kraenzl.
Calceolaria mollissima Walp.
Calceolaria monantha Kraenzl.
Calceolaria morisii Walp.
Calceolaria moyobambae Kraenzl.
Calceolaria myriophylla Kraenzl.
Calceolaria neglecta Molau
Calceolaria nevadensis (Pennell) Standl.
Calceolaria nitida Colla
Calceolaria nivalis Kunth
Calceolaria nudicaulis Benth.
Calceolaria obliqua Molau
Calceolaria oblonga Ruiz & Pav.
Calceolaria obtusa Molau
Calceolaria odontophylla Molau
Calceolaria olivacea Molau
Calceolaria oreophila Molau
Calceolaria oxapampensis Puppo
Calceolaria oxyphylla Molau
Calceolaria pallida Phil.
Calceolaria paposana Phil.
Calceolaria paralia Cav.
Calceolaria parviflora Gillies ex Benth.
Calceolaria parvifolia Wedd.
Calceolaria pavonii Benth.
Calceolaria pedunculata Molau
Calceolaria penlandii Pennell
Calceolaria pennellii Descole & Borsini
Calceolaria percaespitosa Wooden
Calceolaria perfoliata L.f.
Calceolaria petioalaris Cav.
Calceolaria phaceliifolia Edwin
Calceolaria phaeotricha Molau
Calceolaria picta Phil.
Calceolaria pilosa Molau
Calceolaria pinifolia Cav.
Calceolaria pinnata L.
Calceolaria pisacomensis Meyen ex Walp.
Calceolaria platyzyga Diels
Calceolaria plectranthifolia Walp.
Calceolaria poikilanthes Sandwith
Calceolaria polifolia Hook.
Calceolaria polyclada Kraenzl.
Calceolaria polyrhiza Cav.
Calceolaria procera Pennell
Calceolaria psammophila Skottsb.
Calceolaria pulverulenta Ruiz & Pav.
Calceolaria pumila Edwin
Calceolaria punicea Ruiz & Pav.
Calceolaria purpurascens (Kraenzl.) Molau
Calceolaria purpurea Graham
Calceolaria quitoensis Pennell
Calceolaria ramosa Molau
Calceolaria rariflora Molau
Calceolaria reichlinii Edwin
Calceolaria revoluta Pennell
Calceolaria rhacodes Kraenzl.
Calceolaria rhododendroides Kraenzl.
Calceolaria rhombifolia Molau
Calceolaria rinconada Ehrh.
Calceolaria rivularis Kraenzl.
Calceolaria rosmarinifolia Lam.
Calceolaria rotundifolia Kunth
Calceolaria rubiginosa Ehrh.
Calceolaria rufescens Molau
Calceolaria rugulosa Edwin
Calceolaria ruiz-lealii Descole & Borsini
Calceolaria rupestris Molau
Calceolaria salicifolia Ruiz & Pav.
Calceolaria santolinoides Kraenzl.
Calceolaria scabra Ruiz & Pav.
Calceolaria scapiflora (Ruiz & Pav.) Benth.
Calceolaria schickendantziana Kraenzl.
Calceolaria sclerophylla Molau
Calceolaria segethii Phil.
Calceolaria semiconnata Pennell
Calceolaria sericea Pennell
Calceolaria serrata Lam.
Calceolaria sessilis Ruiz & Pav.
Calceolaria sibthorpioides Kunth
Calceolaria sonchensis Pennell ex Edwin
Calceolaria soratensis Kraenzl.
Calceolaria sotarensis Pennell
Calceolaria sparsiflora Kunze
Calceolaria spathulata Witasek
Calceolaria speciosa Pennell
Calceolaria spruceana Kraenzl.
Calceolaria stellariifolia Phil.
Calceolaria stricta Kunth
Calceolaria talcana J.Grau & C.Ehrh.
Calceolaria tenella Poepp.
Calceolaria tenuis Benth.
Calceolaria ternata Molau
Calceolaria tetragona Benth.
Calceolaria teucrioides Griseb.
Calceolaria thyrsiflora Graham
Calceolaria tomentosa Ruiz & Pav.
Calceolaria trichanthera Molau
Calceolaria triloba Edwin
Calceolaria trilobata Hemsl.
Calceolaria tripartita Ruiz & Pav.
Calceolaria tucumana Descole
Calceolaria umbellata Wedd.
Calceolaria undulata Benth.
Calceolaria uniflora Lam.
Calceolaria urticifolia Molau
Calceolaria utricularioides Hook. ex Benth.
Calceolaria vaccinioides Kraenzl.
Calceolaria valdiviana Phil.
Calceolaria variifolia Edwin
Calceolaria velutina Pennell
Calceolaria velutinoides Edwin
Calceolaria verbascifolia Phil.
Calceolaria virgata Ruiz & Pav.
Calceolaria viscosa Ruiz & Pav.
Calceolaria viscosissima (Hook.) Lindl.
Calceolaria volckmannii Phil.
Calceolaria vulpina Kraenzl.
Calceolaria weberbaueriana Kraenzl.
Calceolaria werdermannii Kraenzl.
Calceolaria williamsii Phil.
Calceolaria zamorana Molau

References

External links

Chilean Calceolarias, in Chileflora, seed provider

 
Lamiales genera